Mitgutsch is a surname of:

 Ali Mitgutsch (German: [ˈaːli ˈmɪtˌɡʊt͡ʃ] (listen); 21 August 1935 – 10 January 2022), German author of picture books
 Anna Mitgutsch (born 2 October 1948), Austrian writer and educator

Surnames
German-language surnames